Ecuador competed at the 2016 Summer Paralympics in Rio de Janeiro, Brazil, from 7 September to 18 September 2016. The team consisted of five athletes, four men, one woman, and one male sighted guide.

Athletics

Men's Track

Men's Field

Women's Field

See also 
Ecuador at the 2016 Summer Olympics

References 

Nations at the 2016 Summer Paralympics
2016
2016 in Ecuadorian sport